Pertemba (born 15 February 1948), also called Pertemba Sherpa, is a professional Nepalese mountaineer, trek leader and businessman. He reached the summit of Mount Everest by the Southwest Face on the first expedition to successfully take that route, in 1975.

Biography
Pertemba was born in 1948 in Khumjung, Solukhumbu where his father farmed with about forty yaks. He was sent to live with his grandparents near Cho Oyo in the Gokyo valley when he was five and then his aunts living near Tengboche Monastery looked after him. He studied with the monks there but when he was eight he became very ill and almost died. He started his education in 1961 at a school founded by Edmund Hillary was first opened and where he stayed for five years. Failing to get a scholarship to continue his education, in 1966 he got a job in the kitchen at Lukla Airport and then, helped by his knowledge of English, he moved to Kathmandu to join the first trekking agency in Nepal, Jimmy Roberts' Mountain Travel. He first was a high-altitude porter on a number of expeditions before he became a Sherpa leader or sirdar.

He has donated his family's ancestral house in Khumjung for it to become the Sherpa Heritage House museum – it is the last traditional house in Solu Khhumbu. Pertemba is vice chairman of the Himalayan Trust and was a founder member of the Kathmandu Environmental Education Project. He has been an executive member of the Himalayan Rescue Association, and of the Nepal Mountaineering Association. He has been awarded the Order of Gorkha Dakshina Bahu (first class) by the King of Nepal.  Bonington has described him as being assured and dynamic. Pertemba is married and has children.

Mountaineering and trekking
He took part as a climber in Chris Bonington's 1970 Annapurna and 1975 Everest Southwest Face expeditions (the latter as sirdar). Bonington said he consulted Pertemba frequently, sometimes to the irritation of the lead climbers when he accepted the sirdar's opinion over theirs of the capabilities of the Sherpas and even on the best route to be followed. He was expedition co-leader on the American first ascent of Gauri Sankar in 1979. He has climbed Mount Everest three times although he stopped climbing in 1995 while continuing to lead climbing and trekking expeditions.

In 1985 with two business partners he established a trekking agency called Nepal Himal and he has given climbing seminars in the United States and Europe. Pertemba has also climbed in Switzerland, Alaska and Britain.

See also
List of Mount Everest summiters by number of times to the summit
List of 20th-century summiters of Mount Everest

References

1949 births
Living people
People from Solukhumbu District
Nepalese mountain climbers
Nepalese summiters of Mount Everest
Sherpa summiters of Mount Everest
Members of the Order of Gorkha Dakshina Bahu, First Class